Tamil is a Unicode block containing characters for the Tamil, and Saurashtra languages of Tamil Nadu India, Sri Lanka, Singapore, and Malaysia. In its original incarnation, the code points U+0B82..U+0BCD were a direct copy of the Tamil characters A2-ED from the 1988 ISCII standard. The Devanagari, Bengali, Gurmukhi, Gujarati, Oriya, Telugu, Kannada, and Malayalam blocks were similarly all based on their ISCII encodings.

Block

History
The following Unicode-related documents record the purpose and process of defining specific characters in the Tamil block:

See also
 Tamil script
 Tamil Supplement (Unicode block)

References 

Tamil character-encoding standards
Unicode blocks